Enrique Arturo Laguerre Vélez (July 15, 1905 – June 16, 2005) was a teacher, novelist, playwright, critic, and newspaper columnist from Moca, Puerto Rico. He is the author of the 1935 novel La Llamarada, which has been for many years obligatory reading in many literature courses in Puerto Rico.

Biography
Laguerre studied at various universities, obtaining degrees in arts from the University of Puerto Rico and Columbia University.

In 1924, he took courses on teaching in rural areas in the town of Aguadilla. The courses were taught by Carmen Gómez Tejera. After this, he taught from 1925 to 1988, both at the elementary school and university levels.

Laguerre was known to use the pen-names of Tristán Ronda, Luis Urayoán, Motial and Alberto Prado, among others. Married for many years to the well-respected writer Luz V. Romero García, he also worked in many Puerto Rican publications before joining the staff of El Vocero.

In 1998, his peers as well as former governors Rafael Hernández Colón and Luis A. Ferré, advocated for Laguerre to be considered for the Nobel Prize in Literature. Despite their efforts, Laguerre was not awarded the prestigious award.

Laguerre was an emeritus member of the Center for Advanced Studies on Puerto Rico and the Caribbean.

Enrique Laguerre died on June 16, 2005, at the age of 99.  His body was buried on the grounds of the Palacete Los Moreau, an old hacienda restored as a museum, in his native town of Moca.

Writings
Laguerre was one of the most prolific novelists of Puerto Rico and was nominated for a Nobel Prize in Literature. Following in the steps of Manuel Zeno Gandía, Laguerre's most influential work focused on the problems of the colonized society. His novel La Llamarada offers a comprehensive view of rural Puerto Rico during the Great Depression. Most of his novels are essential readings in Puerto Rican literature courses.

Works

Literary Works - Novels
La Llamarada (1935)
Solar Montoya (1941)
El 30 de Febrero (1942)
La Resaca (1949)
Los Dedos de la Mano (1950)
La Ceiba en el Tiesto (1956)
El Laberinto (1959)
El Laberinto in English The Labyrinth(1960)
Cauce sin Río: Diario de mi Generación (1962)
El Fuego y su Aire (1970)
Los Amos Benévolos (1976)
Los Amos Benévolos in English The Benevolent Masters 1986
Infiernos Privados (1986)
Por Boca de Caracoles (1990)
Los Gemelos (1992)
Proa Libre Sobre Mar Gruesa (1995)
Contrapunto de Soledades (1999)

Ensayos y Teatro
La Resentida (1949)
Antología de Cuentos Puertorriqueños (1954)
Pulso de Puerto Rico (1956)
Enrique Laguerre Habla Sobre Nuestras Bibliotecas (1959)
Obras Completas (1962)
La Responsabilidad de un Profesor Universitario (1963)
El Jíbaro de Puerto Rico: Símbolo y Figura (1968)
La Poesía Modernista en Puerto Rico (1969)
Polos de la Cultura Iberoamericana (1977)

See also

List of Puerto Ricans
French immigration to Puerto Rico
List of Puerto Rican writers
Puerto Rican literature

References

External links
 
Enrique Laguerre recorded at the Library of Congress for the Hispanic Division’s audio literary archive on Mar. 2, 1978

1905 births
2005 deaths
Columbia University alumni
People from Moca, Puerto Rico
Puerto Rican people of French descent
Puerto Rican poets
Puerto Rican male writers
20th-century American poets
20th-century American male writers